Yusefabad (also Romanized as Yūsefābād) is a village in Qurigol Rural District, in the Central District of Bostanabad County, East Azerbaijan Province, Iran. At the 2006 census, its population was 233, in 52 families.

References 

Populated places in Bostanabad County